AutoQ3D Community is a cross-platform CAD software, suited for 3D modeling and texturing. The main objective of this software development is to take away the hassle and complexity for sketching and drawing in 3D. AutoQ3D Community is not a professional CAD program and it is targeted at beginners who want to make rapid 3D designs. It offers plenty of features but is relatively simple to learn and use.

AutoQ3D Community is written in C++ using the Qt application framework and supports the OpenGL API.

Software Features
 Command line support
Color and Texture (Multiple materials for any model, Materials can be solid colors or image-map textures, Simple texture coordinate editing, Texture UV)
Extras. (Predefined views options, UNDO command).
Graphics Tools ( UCS icon, Flip Triangles, Zoom, Pan, Circle, Polygon, Move, Rotate, Scale, Line, Move, Stretch, Mirror, Snap To Objects, Revolve, Array)
 Multiple Image File Formats Support
Rendering (Normal Shading, Wireframe, Shade Hide Lines Option)
 Supported 3D File Formats. (Import .DXF File Format 2004, 2000, R14. Export .DXF File Format (DXF 2000). Import .MD2 Frames File Format (Quake File Format).

External links

 
https://sourceforge.net/projects/autoq3d/
 3D Modeling Software for Beginners
 

Free 3D graphics software
Free computer-aided design software
Free software programmed in C++
Computer-aided design software for Linux
3D modeling software for Linux
Computer-aided design software for Windows
MacOS computer-aided design software
3D graphics software
Computer-aided design software
Engineering software that uses Qt
3D graphics software that uses Qt